Kahn Fotuali'i (born 22 May 1982) is a Samoan rugby union player for Montpellier in the Top 14. He plays as a scrum-half.

In 2002 he played with New Haven Rugby in the United States and led the club to a Division II national championship playing primarily at #10. In 2004, he debuted for Nelson Bays, who later merged with Marlborough to form the Tasman Rugby Union. In 2008, he made his Crusaders debut. Fotuali'i had a successful year in 2010 scoring five tries for the Crusaders and starting most games ahead of All Blacks halfback Andy Ellis until he was suspended for breaking Crusaders protocol. However, from his impressive form on the field for the Crusaders many thought Fotuali'i would be very close to All Black selection.

In 2010 Fotuali'i chose to represent Samoa for their 2010 end-of-year tour. He made his debut for them against Japan where he scored Samoa's only try to win the game 13-10 and was man of the match.

He signed a two-year deal with Welsh side Ospreys ahead of the 2011/12 season. He scored his first try for the Ospreys against Glasgow Warriors in a 20–26 defeat.

Early in 2013, he was still with Ospreys, but there was speculation that he might join another club in Europe. He rejected a new deal by the Ospreys and signed for Northampton Saints on 24 January 2013. In 2014 he started as Northampton beat Saracens to win the Premiership final.

Towards the end of the 2015/16 season, whilst at Northampton Saints it was rumoured that he had signed for another premiership team, Bath Rugby. At the Saints last game of the season, at Gloucester, this was confirmed.

On September 3, 2016, Kahn Fotuali'i made his Bath Rugby debut against his former Northampton Saints team, with Bath winning the match 18–14 at Northampton for the first time in 16 years.

On 28 June 2019, Fotuali'i signed a one-year contract to join French side Montpellier in the Top 14 for the 2019–20 season.

References

External links

1982 births
Living people
Rugby union players from Auckland
New Zealand sportspeople of Samoan descent
Rugby union scrum-halves
Crusaders (rugby union) players
Tasman rugby union players
Hawke's Bay rugby union players
Samoa international rugby union players
New Zealand rugby union players
Ospreys (rugby union) players
Northampton Saints players
New Zealand expatriate rugby union players
New Zealand expatriate sportspeople in England
Expatriate rugby union players in Wales
New Zealand expatriate sportspeople in Wales
Nelson Bays rugby union players
People educated at Onehunga High School
Bath Rugby players
Montpellier Hérault Rugby players